Goldenstedt is a municipality in the district of Vechta, in Lower Saxony, Germany. It is situated on the river Hunte, approximately 12 km northeast of Vechta.

References

Vechta (district)